is a Japanese company headquartered in Tokyo, Japan, that offers IT services,  system integration, cloud computing, and information security.

Overview
In 1980, Nippon Steel Computer System Corp. was established by Nippon Steel Corp.  After several computer system companies and divisions in Nippon Steel group were merged, NS Solutions Corp. was established in 2001. In 2012, Nippon Steel Corp. and Sumitomo Metal Industries Ltd. were merged into Nippon Steel & Sumitomo Metal Corp. The company name remains as NS Solutions Corp. in English.

The company offers system integration, cloud computing, information security, and IT lifecycle support in Japan. The services are mostly for enterprises and are separated from Nippon Steel & Sumitomo Metal group.

The business type and scope is similar to Itochu Techno-Solutions, SCSK and Uniadex. NS Solutions has established a partnership with Oracle, and invested Oracle Japan, since 1991. The company was listed on the Tokyo Stock Exchange 1st Section (2327.TYO) in October 2002.  

In 2017, NS Solutions acquired Net Value Components Ltd., a company that offers network integration and operation.

See also
 List of companies of Japan

References

External links
 Official website

Cloud computing providers 
Computer security companies 
Information technology consulting firms of Japan
Service companies based in Tokyo 
1980 establishments in Japan
Companies listed on the Tokyo Stock Exchange